Yi Sang-ryong (November 24, 1859 – June 15, 1932) was a Korean Liberation activist, serving as the third president of the Provisional Government of the Republic of Korea from 1925 to 1926. Yi Sang-ryong, along with Yi Si-yeong and Yi Dong-nyung, started the Military School of the New Rising (Sinheung Mugwan Hakkyo 신흥무관학교) in 1911. He participated in Korean independence movement

Notes

Korean independence activists
1858 births
1932 deaths
Goseong Lee clan